Stegea mexicana is a moth in the family Crambidae. It is found in Mexico (Veracruz).

References

Moths described in 1964
Glaphyriinae